The 1977 season of the World Championship Tennis (WCT) circuit was one of the two rival professional male tennis circuits of 1977. It was organized by World Championship Tennis (WCT) and consisted of a preliminary series of twelve tournaments leading up to a singles play-off in Dallas and doubles play-off in Kansas City in May. 23 players participated and the season final was played by the eight best performers. It was won by American Jimmy Connors who defeated compatriot Dick Stockton in four sets. The total prize money for the 1977 WCT circuit was $2,400,000.

Additionally there were three special events that did not count towards the standings; the Aetna World Cup held in Hartford between America and Australia (10–13 March), the $320,000 Challenge Cup in Las Vegas (14–20 November) and the Tournament of Champions held in Lakeway, Texas (10–13 March, 10–13 July) and Madison Square Garden, New York (17 September).

Borg lawsuit
In February the WCT sued Björn Borg, as well as his management company IMG claiming that Borg had committed a breach of contract by electing to participate in the competing 1977 Grand Prix circuit instead of the WCT circuit. Borg eventually played a single WCT event, the Monte Carlo WCT, and won the tournament. As part of the settlement Borg committed to playing six or eight WCT events in 1978 which were then part of the Grand Prix circuit.

Overview

Schedule
The schedule of events on the 1977 WCT circuit, with player progression documented until the quarterfinals stage.

January

February

March

April

Special events
These WCT events did not count towards the standings.

Standings

* Qualified for the WCT Finals.

See also
 1977 Grand Prix circuit

References

External links
 ATP 1977 results archive

 
World Championship Tennis circuit seasons
World Championship Tennis